Antowain Drurell Smith (born March 14, 1972) is a former American Football running back in the National Football League (NFL) who played nine NFL seasons, most notably with the New England Patriots, with whom he won two Super Bowls, and the Buffalo Bills.  At 6'2", 232 pounds, Smith's powerful running style made him an effective runner between the tackles.

High school career
Smith attended Stanhope Elmore High School in Millbrook, Alabama and played football only in his senior year.

College career
Smith worked in a factory for two years before enrolling at East Mississippi Junior College in 1993. At East Mississippi, Smith was a JUCO All-American running back. In 1995, Smith transferred to the University of Houston and played two seasons on the Houston Cougars football team at running back. In 21 games with Houston, Smith rushed for 1,847 yards and 19 touchdowns. Among records set by Smith include the longest touchdown in school history at 96 yards and six touchdowns in one game.

In his senior season, Smith rushed for 1,239 yards and 14 touchdowns, while also catching 28 passes for 201 yards and another score.

Professional career
Antowain Smith was drafted in the first round of the 1997 NFL Draft by the Buffalo Bills.  In his rookie season Smith ran for 840 yards and 8 touchdowns with also catching 28 passes.  The next season Smith ran for 1,124 yards and again scored 8 times, although his yards per carry dropped from 4.3 to 3.7.  Smith gained just 27 total yards in the Bills first round playoff loss in 1998.  The next season was disappointing and saw Smith score 6 times while rushing for just 614 yards.  He did manage to run for 79 yards and two scores in the Bill's first round playoff game but the Bills still lost to the Titans.  Having fallen out of favor with the coaching staff Smith ran for just 354 yards and 4 touchdowns in 2000.

The next season Smith rejuvenated his professional career when he joined the New England Patriots.  He ran for 1,157 yards and 12 touchdowns in the regular season.  He also ran for 204 yards in the playoffs as the Patriots won Super Bowl XXXVI. The iconic moment of him being the first Patriot to run onto the field after Adam Vinatieri kicked the game-winning field goal as time expired is what Smith is remembered for the most in his career. Smith's numbers dropped off a bit in 2002 as he ran for 982 yards and 6 touchdowns.  He did get more involved in the passing game however, and caught 31 balls including 2 touchdowns.  2003 was Smith's final season in New England and he managed just 642 yards, although he still led the team in rushing.  His play improved in the playoffs that year as he ran for 252 yards and 2 scores as Smith and the Patriots won their second Super Bowl championship, Super Bowl XXXVIII.

Smith joined the Titans for 2004 and he ran for 509 yards.  It was the only season in his career in which he failed to record a single 100 yard game.  Smith played his final NFL season in 2005, with the New Orleans Saints, running for 659 yards and 3 scores.  For his career Smith played in 131 games, running for 6,881 yards and 54 touchdowns, good for 50th and 44th on the all-time lists respectively.

References

1972 births
Living people
People from Millbrook, Alabama
Players of American football from Alabama
African-American players of American football
American football running backs
New Orleans Saints players
Tennessee Titans players
New England Patriots players
Buffalo Bills players
Houston Texans players
Houston Cougars football players
East Mississippi Lions football players
21st-century African-American sportspeople
20th-century African-American sportspeople